Oroplema simplex is a species of moth of the  family Uraniidae. It is found in southern India and Sri Lanka.

References

Moths described in 1899
Uraniidae